Lab Rats: Elite Force is an American comedy television series created by Chris Peterson and Bryan Moore that aired on Disney XD from March 2 to October 22, 2016. The series is a combined spinoff of Lab Rats and Mighty Med and stars William Brent, Bradley Steven Perry, Jake Short, Paris Berelc, and Kelli Berglund.

Premise 
Davenport has come up with a plan to form an elite team of bionic heroes and superheroes to fight a common threat from their headquarters in Centium City. He puts his plan into action after villains have destroyed Mighty Med Hospital.

Cast and characters

Main 
 William Brent as Chase, the intellectual bionic brother of Bree and the Elite Force’s mission leader until the events of Follow The Leader.
 Bradley Steven Perry as Kaz, Oliver’s immature best friend who doesn’t always think things through but takes saving others seriously.
 Jake Short as Oliver, best friend of Kaz and has a crush on his other best friend Skylar. Along with Kaz, Oliver gets superpowers from the ending of Mighty Med and working on controlling them.
 Paris Berelc as Skylar, the alien superhero from the planet Caldera, who is trying to get her powers restored, and Bree’s new ‘sister figure’.
 Kelli Berglund as Bree, the sister of Chase, who is also bionic and Skylar’s new best friend. Later in the series, Bree gains superpowers from the Arcturion space rock and is currently learning how to adjust both them and her bionics combined.

Notable guest stars 
 Hal Sparks as Davenport
 Booboo Stewart as Roman
 Ryan Potter as Riker
 Jeremy Kent Jackson as Douglas
 Johnathan McClain as Tony
 Maile Flanagan as Perry
 Brandon Salgado-Telis as Bob
 Angel Parker as Tasha

Production 
Lab Rats: Elite Force was created by Chris Peterson and Bryan Moore, the duo who created Lab Rats. It is produced by Britelite Productions and It's a Laugh Productions for Disney XD. On September 3, 2015, it was announced that Lab Rats and Mighty Med would have a joint spinoff series called Lab Rats: Elite Force. Only William Brent, formerly credited as Billy Unger, and Kelli Berglund from Lab Rats and Bradley Steven Perry, Jake Short, and Paris Berelc from Mighty Med were announced as returning for the new spinoff series. Production on the series began in October 2015. It was subsequently announced that Lab Rats: Elite Force would premiere on Disney XD broadcast services on March 2, 2016, and will be available for earlier viewing on the channel's video-on-demand services on February 29, 2016.

In October 2016, actress Kelli Berglund reported on Twitter that there would not be a second season of Lab Rats: Elite Force.

Broadcast 
The series premiered in Canada on Disney XD on March 2, 2016, and on Disney Channel on March 6, 2016.

On October 13, 2016, series co-creator Bryan Moore posted on Twitter that there would be a Lab Rats marathon followed by the finale of Lab Rats: Elite Force, "The Attack", which aired on October 22, 2016.

Reception 
Emily Ashby of Common Sense Media gave the series four out of five stars.

Episodes

Ratings 
 
}}

Notes

References

External links 
 

2010s American superhero comedy television series
2016 American television series debuts
2016 American television series endings
Disney XD original programming
Television series by It's a Laugh Productions
2010s American comic science fiction television series